Only Yesterday Original Soundtrack is the soundtrack to the 1991 Japanese animated film Only Yesterday by Studio Ghibli. It was released on July 25, 1991, by Tokuma Shoten, and the music on the album consists of several Eastern European songs, such as in Bulgarian, Hungarian, Italian and Romanian languages. The presence of music in the feature film, draws a parallel between the peasant world and Japanese rural life.

In the end credits of Only Yesterday the track "Ai wa Hana, Kimi wa Sono Tane" is played, a Japanese language version of "The Rose", performed by American singer Amanda McBroom, and in Japanese by Harumi Miyako, which was translated by Katsu Hoshi. The full track-list

Track listing

References 

1991 soundtrack albums
1990s film soundtrack albums